The Light Shines On is a compilation album by Electric Light Orchestra (ELO). This is the second Harvest compilation of their early years with the label, followed in 1979 by volume 2. It features 5 tracks from ELO's debut album, 3 tracks from their second album and the non album single Showdown, although both 10538 Overture and Roll Over Beethoven are the single edits. The full length versions are featured on volume 2.

Track listing 

Side one

Side two

Personnel
Jeff Lynne – bass, percussion, piano, guitar, vocals, Moog synthesizer
Roy Wood – guitar, bass, clarinet, percussion, bassoon, cello, oboe, recorder, vocals, slide guitar
Bev Bevan – percussion, drums
Bill Hunt – French horn
Steve Woolam – violin
Mike de Albuquerque – bass, vocals
Mike Edwards – cello
Wilfred Gibson – violin
Richard Tandy – Moog synthesizer, piano, guitar, harmonium
Colin Walker – cello

Certifications

References

Albums with cover art by Hipgnosis
1977 greatest hits albums
Albums produced by Roy Wood
Albums produced by Jeff Lynne
Electric Light Orchestra compilation albums
Harvest Records compilation albums